The Most Extreme is a documentary television series on the American cable television network Animal Planet. It first aired on July 7, 2002. Each episode focuses on a specific animal feature, such as strength, speed, behavior, anatomy, or diet, and examines and ranks ten animals that portray extreme or unusual examples of that quality. Along with each animal on the countdown, each episode presents a computer-animated segment which compares the animal's ability with something equivalent in humans, followed by an interview segment with people who share some common trait. Old, often public domain, cartoons, movie clips and trailers are often include

Episodes 

The show was narrated by Adam J. Harrington. On Animal Planet, the episodes were also announced by Simon Arnstein.

Season 1

Season 2

Season 3

Season 4

Season 5

References

External links
 

2002 American television series debuts
2007 American television series endings
Animal Planet original programming
English-language television shows
Television series about animals